Barangay East Rembo or previosuly known as Barangay 15 is a Barangay or Barrio in Makati's 2nd congressional district. It Borders West Rembo on its North, Pasig on its East, Bonifacio Global City on its West, and Comembo on its South.

History 
The History of East Rembo started in 1954 when the PAF authorized the construction of Barrios for the reserved military serving in the armed forces who were living in Fort Bonifacio. East Rembo is the heart of the three barangays of West Rembo, Comembo and Pembo. These settlements were named after EMBO, which means "Enlisted Men's Barrio''

East Rembo is claimed to be a self-sustaining community. Because after its foundation, it is recorded to haven't received any assistance from the military administration. The military administration of the barrio begun in 1956 when, President Ferdinand E. Marcos issued Presidential Proclamation 2425. in 1986, it was turned over to the Administration of Makati City.

The Barangay, like every barangays in Makati, has its own Parish church, named the Mater Dolorosa Parish.

References

External links

Barangays of Metro Manila
Makati